Szkuciska  is a village in the administrative district of Gmina Wilków, within Opole Lubelskie County, Lublin Voivodeship, in eastern Poland.

The village has a population of 36.

References

Szkuciska